Imantocera arenosa is a species of beetle in the family Cerambycidae. It was described by Francis Polkinghorne Pascoe in 1862. It is known from Cambodia and Thailand.

References

Lamiini
Beetles described in 1862